Lawrence Ardren, Ardran or Ardern (by 1523 – 1570), of Chichester, Sussex, was an English politician.

Career
He was Mayor of Chichester for 1564 and elected a Member of Parliament (MP) for Chichester in 1558.

References

1570 deaths
English MPs 1558
Mayors of Chichester
Year of birth uncertain